David Timothy Simmonds  is a British politician who has served as the Member of Parliament (MP) for Ruislip, Northwood and Pinner since 2019. A member of the  Conservative Party, he is a former councillor on Hillingdon London Borough Council, having served from 1998 to 2022.

Early life and education 
Simmonds was born in 1976, the son of Rory and Veronica Simmonds. He attended Cardinal Newman Comprehensive School in Pontypridd, before going to Grey College, University of Durham, where he gained a BA (Hons). Simmonds gained a Postgraduate Certificate at Birkbeck College, University of London, and a Financial Planning Certificate from the Chartered Institute of Insurers. His professional background is in financial services, where he worked for several high street banks after qualifying with the CII in 1997. He was a non-executive director at NHS Hillingdon.

Political career

Local government 
Simmonds was elected as a councillor for the London Borough of Hillingdon in 1998, gaining his seat in Cowley (at the time, part of the Uxbridge constituency) from the Labour Party. From 2002 to 2022, he represented the borough's Ickenham ward.

He has served in hung and majority administrations as a committee chairman and Cabinet Member, with responsibilities including planning, housing, social services, education and children's services. He led work for the Local Government Association in a number of high-profile areas including children's services, education, immigration and Brexit, serving as Conservative Group Leader and Deputy Chairman of the organisation representing councils. Simmonds was also Chairman of the Children and Young People Board from 2011 to 2015.

At the 2005 general election, he stood in Erewash, Derbyshire, coming second to the Labour incumbent. He previously stood in Caerphilly, South Wales, where he grew up, in 2001.

His previous public service includes as Chairman of the National Employer's Organisation for Schoolteachers (NEOST) and of the European Federation of Education Employers (EFEE), as an active member of the Committee of the Regions and leader of the UK Conservative delegation there, and at the Congress of the Council of Europe.

He is particularly well known for his work on refugee children and led the implementation of the Vulnerable Persons Relocation Scheme (VPRS) with then-Home Secretary Theresa May to resettle vulnerable refugees to areas of the UK volunteering to take them in.

He served as Deputy Chairman and previously Treasurer of the Conservative Councillors Association, and served as an associate non-executive director in his local NHS and as a magistrate in North-West London. He stepped down as Deputy Leader of Hillingdon Council and as Deputy Chairman of the LGA following his election to Parliament. He was Deputy Leader of the council from 2002 to 2020, and Deputy Chairman of the LGA from 2015 to 2020.

In Parliament 
Simmonds won the safe Conservative seat of Ruislip, Northwood and Pinner at the 2019 general election, succeeding the retiring incumbent, Nick Hurd. The constituency includes the Ickenham ward he represented as a Hillingdon councillor. In Parliament, Simmonds is a member of the Education Select Committee and the Finance Committee.

Simmonds is the Chair of the All-Party Parliamentary Group on Migration, the APPG on Housing and Planning, the APPG for Social Workers, and the APPG for Airport Communities reflecting his diverse interests arising from his experience in local government.

On 7 July 2022, Simmonds was elected to the executive of the 1922 committee of backbench Conservative MPs.

Honours 
He was awarded a CBE in the 2015 Birthday Honours list.

Personal life 
Simmonds is married to an NHS doctor, and has two children. He lists his recreations as travelling in Europe, wine and modern British prints.

References

External links

Living people
UK MPs 2019–present
Conservative Party (UK) MPs for English constituencies
Alumni of Grey College, Durham
1976 births